Belgium chose their Junior Eurovision entry for 2008 through Junior Eurosong, a national final consisting of 10 songs split into two quarter-finals, a semi-final and a grand final. The winner of Junior Eurosong was Oliver Symons, with the song "Shut Up!".

Before Eurovision

Junior Eurosong 2008 
Junior Eurosong was the national final for Belgium at the Junior Eurovision Song Contest 2008, organised by Belgian broadcaster Vlaamse Radio- en Televisieomroep (VRT).

Format 
The format of the competition consisted of four shows: two quarter-finals, one semi-final and a final. All shows were hosted by Ben Roelants.

Results during the heats and the semi-final shows were determined by the three-member jury panel and votes from the public. In the quarter-finals the songs first faced a public televote where the top two entries qualified. The jury then selected an additional qualifier from the remaining entries to proceed in the competition. In the semi-finals the songs first faced a public televote where the top three entries qualified. The jury then selected an additional qualifier from the remaining entries to proceed in the competition. In the final, public televoting exclusively determined the winner.

The jury participated in each show by providing feedback to the competing artists and selecting entries to advance in the competition. The panel consists of:

 Stijn Kolacny
 Pascale Platel
 Andre Vermeulen

Competing entries 
A total of 548 songs were received by VRT for the contest, with only 10 (nine in Dutch and one in French) being chosen to compete in the national final.

Quarter-final 1 
The first quarter-final took place on 6 September 2008. Three entries qualified to the final. The five competing entries first faced a public televote where the top two songs advanced: "Waarom?" performed by The Pinsons and "Vergeet-mij-liedje" performed by Mathilde. An additional qualifier was selected from the remaining three entries by the jury: "Shut Up!" performed by Oliver.

Quarter-final 2 
The second quarter-final took place on 13 September 2008. Three entries qualified to the final. The five competing entries first faced a public televote where the top two songs advanced: "Samen" performed by Didier & Charlotte and "Ik hou van muziek" performed by Guust. An additional qualifier was selected from the remaining three entries by the jury: "Un nouveau rêve" performed by Chloé.

Semi-final 
The semi-final took place on 20 September 2008. Four entries qualified to the final. The six competing entries first faced a public televote where the top three songs advanced: "Un nouveau rêve" performed by Chloé, "Ik hou van muziek" performed by Guust and "Samen" performed by Didier & Charlotte. An additional qualifier was selected from the remaining six entries by the jury: "Shut Up!" performed by Oliver.

Final
The final took place on 27 September 2008. "Shut Up!" performed by Oliver was selected as the winner after accumulating the highest number of televotes.

At Junior Eurovision 
At Junior Eurovision, Belgium performed in seventh position, before Bulgaria and after Georgia. The presentation of the Belgian song was changed. Three female dancers and a drummer were introduced to the performance. Belgium placed in 11th position with 45 points; the highest of which was 10 points, which came from the Netherlands.

Voting

After Junior Eurovision 
After the Belgian national final, Junior Eurosong, "Shut Up!" was released into the Flemish charts. Its peak in the charts was at #19.

Notes

References

External links 
 Official Belgian JESC Site
 Official Oliver's page at broadcaster's website

Junior Eurovision Song Contest
2008
Belgium